Tau Devi Lal Stadium is a multi-sport stadium located in Sector 3, Panchkula, a satellite town in the outskirts of Chandigarh.

It is the home ground of I-League side RoundGlass Punjab FC.

The ground situated next to Tau Devi Lal Cricket Stadium and consists of a synthetic running track and a football pitch at the center.

References

Football venues in Haryana
Multi-purpose stadiums in India
Sports venues in Haryana
Sport in Chandigarh
2007 establishments in Haryana
Sports venues completed in 2007